WSJY (107.3 FM) is a radio station  broadcasting an adult contemporary format. Licensed to Fort Atkinson, Wisconsin, United States, the station serves a significant portion of southern Wisconsin, mainly in the areas of Fort Atkinson, Janesville  and Madison, with its signal also reaching into the Rockford area and the western suburbs of Milwaukee. It broadcasts from a tower south of Edgerton, Wisconsin. The station is owned by Magnum Media Group, through licensee Magnum Communications, Inc.

History

The station went on the air as WFAW-FM in 1959.  On July 6, 1981, the station changed its call sign to the current WSJY.

Prior to adult contemporary, the station had a beautiful music format, first as "FM 107", then with the change of calls to WSJY, "Joy FM 107".

References

External links

SJY
Mainstream adult contemporary radio stations in the United States
Radio stations established in 1959
1959 establishments in Wisconsin